59 Broad Street is a Category B listed building in Peterhead, Aberdeenshire, Scotland. Dating to the mid 18th century, the residential building stands with its gable end facing onto Broad Street. This was traditionally done because homeowners were taxed according to street frontage.

See also
List of listed buildings in Peterhead, Aberdeenshire

References
Specific

General
A mention of the property from 1880 - Index to Towns and Places Throughout England, Scotland and Wales and Ireland (1880)

External links
 Exterior and interior photos of the property - MasonGlennie.co.uk

Category B listed buildings in Aberdeenshire
Broad Street 59